
Gmina Warlubie is a rural gmina (administrative district) in Świecie County, Kuyavian-Pomeranian Voivodeship, in north-central Poland.

The gmina contains part of the protected area called Wda Landscape Park.

Villages
Gmina Warlubie contains the villages and settlements of Bąkowo, Bąkowski Młyn, Błądziewno, Blizawy, Borowy Młyn, Borsukowo, Bursztynowo, Buśnia, Bzowo, Ciemny Las, Dębowo, Górna Buśnia, Grabowa Góra, Jeżewnica, Komorsk, Krusze, Krzewiny, Kurzejewo, Kuźnica, Lipinki, Mątasek, Nowa Huta, Płochocin, Płochocinek, Przewodnik, Rulewo, Rybno, Rynków, Średnia Huta, Stara Huta, Warlubie, Wielki Komorsk and Zamczyska.

Neighbouring gminas
Gmina Warlubie is bordered by the gminas of Dragacz, Jeżewo, Nowe, Osie and Osiek.

References
 Polish official population figures 2006

Warlubie
Świecie County